Lurgan is an unincorporated community in Lurgan Township in northern Franklin County, Pennsylvania, United States. Lurgan has a post office, with ZIP code 17232.

References

Unincorporated communities in Franklin County, Pennsylvania
Unincorporated communities in Pennsylvania